Similiclava is a monotypic genus of cnidarians belonging to the monotypic family Similiclavidae. The only species is Similiclava nivea.

The species is found in Northern America.

References

Filifera
Hydrozoan genera
Monotypic cnidarian genera